Koznitsa is a railway tunnel under the Koznitsa ridge in the Stara planina (Balkan Mountains), the longest tunnel in Bulgaria. The tunnel is located between the Bulgarian railway stations of Koprivshtitsa and Stryama and is 5,808 m long.

References

 

Railway tunnels in Bulgaria